Jadran means the Adriatic Sea in Serbo-Croatian and Slovene. It may also refer to:

People
 Jadran Radovčić (born 1959), Croatian rower
 Jadran Barut (born 1940), Slovenian rower
 Jadran Vujačić (born 1959), Montenegrin basketball player and coach

Ships
Jadran (ship) (built 1931), a former Yugoslav ship now a Montenegrin Navy training ship
MS Jadran (built 1957), a former passenger ship, converted into Captain John's Harbour Boat Restaurant
MV Jadran (built 2012), a ferry operated by Croatian shipping company Jadrolinija

Sports
NK Jadran Dekani, a Slovenian association football club
NK Jadran Poreč, a Croatian association football club
NK Jadran Kaštel Sućurac, a football club in Croatia
NK Jadran Luka Ploče, a football club in Croatia
PVK Jadran, a water polo club from Herceg Novi, Montenegro

Other
Jadran Film, a Croatian film production company
TV Jadran, a Croatian television station 
Koser KB-3 Jadran, a Yugoslavian sailplane
Jadran or Zadran tribe, a Pashtun group
Jadran (cigarette), a Croatian brand of cigarettes manufactured by the Adris grupa
Jordan Maron a YouTuber, who has been often nicknamed Jadran

See also
 Jadranko, masculine given name often shortened to Jadran
 Jadranka, Jadrana, female counterpart given names